The 2000–01 season was Galatasaray's 97th in existence and the 43rd consecutive season in the 1. Lig. This article shows statistics of the club's players in the season, and also lists all matches that the club have played in the season.

Club

Board of Directors
Elected: 25 March 2000

Facilities

Squad statistics

Players in / out

In

Out

1. Lig

Standings

Matches

Türkiye Kupası
Kick-off listed in local time (EET)

Third round

Fourth round

Quarter-final

Semi-final

UEFA Super Cup

UEFA Champions League

Third qualifying round

First group stage

Second group stage

Quarter-finals

Friendlies

Opel Master Cup

Atatürk Kupası

Attendance

References

Galatasaray S.K. (football) seasons
Galatasaray S.K.
2000s in Istanbul
Galatasaray Sports Club 2000–01 season